Juan Carlos Ortiz Padilla (born 28 June 1985) is a Spanish professional footballer who plays for CF Sant Rafel as a forward. He was born in Córdoba, Andalusia.

References

External links

1985 births
Living people
Footballers from Córdoba, Spain
Spanish footballers
Association football forwards
Segunda División players
Segunda División B players
Tercera División players
Real Valladolid Promesas players
Real Valladolid players
Real Jaén footballers
Algeciras CF footballers
Villajoyosa CF footballers
CD Puertollano footballers
CD Badajoz players
Écija Balompié players
Real Balompédica Linense footballers
Cultural Leonesa footballers
UP Langreo footballers
Coruxo FC players
Global Makati F.C. players
Spanish expatriate footballers
Expatriate footballers in the Philippines